Bronson Burgoon (born June 2, 1987) is an American professional golfer.

Early life 
Burgoon was born in The Woodlands, Texas. He played golf The Woodlands High School and was an individual state champion in 2003.

College career 
Burgoon played college golf at Texas A&M University and defeated Andrew Landry, 1 up, to give the Aggies the 2009 NCAA Championship. He was inducted to the Texas A&M Athletic Hall of Fame in 2018.

Professional career 
After playing on PGA Tour Latinoamérica in 2012 and 2013, Burgoon reached the Web.com Tour for the 2014 season through Q School. In 2015, he finished 18th on the regular-season Web.com Tour money list and graduated to the PGA Tour.

In his rookie PGA Tour season, Burgoon finished 132nd in the FedEx Cup standings, retaining conditional status for 2017. An injury kept him from competing between September 2016 and July 2017. He was granted a non-exempt medical extension, which also made him eligible for the 2017 Web.com Tour Finals. In the Finals, he earned enough to regain full status for the 2018 season.

Burgoon's best finishes on the PGA Tour are a pair of runner-ups at the 2018 John Deere Classic and the CIMB Classic.

Professional wins (2)

Adams Pro Tour wins (2)
2012 Firewheel at Garland Classic, Twin Lakes Open

Source:

Playoff record
Web.com Tour playoff record (0–1)

Source:

Results in major championships

CUT = missed the half-way cut
"T" indicates a tie for a place

Source:

Results in The Players Championship

CUT = missed the halfway cut

Source:

See also
2015 Web.com Tour Finals graduates
2017 Web.com Tour Finals graduates
2019 Korn Ferry Tour Finals graduates
2021 Korn Ferry Tour Finals graduates

References

External links

American male golfers
Texas A&M Aggies men's golfers
PGA Tour golfers
Korn Ferry Tour graduates
Golfers from Texas
People from The Woodlands, Texas
1987 births
Living people